Gilmer County is the name of two counties in the United States:

 Gilmer County, Georgia 
 Gilmer County, West Virginia